Thirunakkara Mahadevar Temple situated in the heart of Kottayam city is one of the 108 revered Shivalayas in central Kerala, India. The temple is about 500 years old and was built by the Thekkumkoor raja. It also preserves a number of unique sculptures and murals of various Hindu deities. A common belief is that the idol of Shiva here is installed by sage Parashurama himself. The Thekkukkoor royal family considered the idol as their paradevatha (tutelary deity) in the form of "Thirunakkara thevar"

History
A King of Thekkumkoor royal dynasty was a big devotee of Thrissur Vadakkumnathan. Though there was a large Shiva temple called Thalikotta Temple near his palace, where he regularly used to visit, he could not be happy without a visit to Vadakkumnathan Temple once in a month. Despite all problems faced, he used to visit Vadakkumnathan Temple throughout his life. But, as years passed, the King became aged, and he could no longer travel for long distance. Thus he was sunk in grief. Lord Shiva appeared before him and consoled him saying that he would appear in a location where his great devotee can travel easily. Thus the King was pleased.

During his return, the King also visited the famous Shiva temple at Vaikom. There he met with a poor Brahmin, named Perepparambu Namboothiri, who was conducting his bhajanam due to financial difficulties. The King told him that he would provide all necessities for getting money, and took him to his palace. That night, the King had a dream, in which Lord Shiva appeared before him, and saying that he would appear in Nakkarakkunnu - a small hill located a few miles away from the palace area - as a Swayambhoo lingam, and there would be an idol of Nandi, his vehicle in front of him, and a white ixora plant on his backside towards the left. The King became very much happy.

Nakkarakkunnu, the place where the present temple exists, was a huge forest area then. Wild animals roamed there without any problem. No one wanted to settle there, even if it was given freely. There was a monastery called Swamiyar Madom, titled Thrikkaikkattu Madom, on the north-east side of the temple. On the day after the King got the darshan of Lord Shiva, two servants from the Swamiyar Madom - Changazhissery Moothathu and Punnassery Moothathu - went to collect wood and fire for a homam (fire ritual). They saw a stone there and scraped their sickle on it, but suddenly it started bleeding. They soon realised that it was a Swayambhoo Shivalingam. The news spread like a bush fire, and it also reached the ears of the King, who could not control his emotions after hearing the news. The King came to the location where the lingam was installed, and prostrated before it. He also found that there was an idol of Nandi in front of it, and a white ixora plant on its backside towards the left. After that, he made the biggest temple in his territory for his favourite deity, with all the major components of a mahakshetra (major temple). Tharananelloor Nammbothiri became the head priest of the temple, and Perepparambu Namboothiri was installed as the senior priest. The King got blessed by visiting the temple, and lived his life happily thereafter.

Brahmarakshas

There is an interesting story behind the Brahma Rakshas. One person called Moose was a great friend of the king. The king was not known for his beauty but his friend Moose was very handsome. The queen fell in love with this friend knowing which the king ordered his servants to kill Moose. Instead of killing him, the King’s servants killed the junior priest of the temple (keezh santhi). The wife of the priest became a Brahma Rakshas and started seeking revenge. So the king built a temple for her. For a long time afterwards, women do not prefer to enter this temple.

Architecture

The temple situated in the heart of Kottayam city is built in the traditional architectural styles of Kerala. The first entrance to the temple includes a small temple for lord Ganapathi which was built recently. After crossing the entrance,  we could see the big ground leading to the holy steps of the temple. There is a banyan tree on steps which is considered sacred by the devotees. The Aanakottil and Kodimaram is placed close to the eastern entrance. The Kodimaram built in 1960 is only 42 feet long. To the side of Kodimaram lies the Balikkalpuras. Like that in Guruvayoor temple, one could clearly see the idol of chief deity from the main entrance itself.

One of the largest Koothambalams in Kerala is in this temple situated in the southeast corner. The temple has shrines for various sub deities in different locations. The southeast entrance consists of the shrines of lord Ayyappa and Ganesha. Naga pratishtas are also close to these shrines. In the northwest section, there is a Chethi (Jungle flame) flower, commonly seen in many Hindu shrines across Kerala. The eastern section includes the shrines of lord Subhramaniya and Durga and the northeast section has the installation of Brahmarakshas which is according to the myths the soul of a priest assassinated inside the temple.

Sreekovil
The two storeyed square shaped sreekovil of temple is very attractive and it is adorned by a golden Finial. The sreekovil includes three separate rooms, one in the west is Garbhagriha which has the Shiva linga idol installed. An idol of Parvathi devi made up of Panchaloha is also installed next to it. This complex has a number of murals depicting the stories of Shiva and Dashavathara. Full circumambulation of the temple is not allowed because it is a Shiva shrine. It is said that Lord Shiva resides in his most peaceful form here, which is considered to be the reason for the prosperity of Kottayam.

Festival
The temple hosts an annual ten-day festival ending with the aaraattu ritual of dipping an idol of a deity into a river or temple tank, which includes a procession of nine decorated elephants. The festival is a celebration of Shiva's wedding to Parvati and is dedicated to Shiva. During the festival, traditional Keralan dances such as Mayilattom and Velakali are performed within the temple premises in the evening. Another major attraction is the Kathakali performances during the festival.

Subordinate deities
 Ganapathi
 Ayyappan
 Subramanyan
 Naga
 Vadakkumnathan (Another manifestation of Shiva, presiding deity at the Vadakkumnathan Temple in Thrissur)
 Durga
 Brahmarakshas

Thirunakkara
Thirunakkara is a locality of  Kottayam city in Kerala, best known for the temple.

References

External links
 Wikimapia views

Hindu temples in Kottayam district
Shiva temples in Kerala
108 Shiva Temples